Super Duper is a now-defunct chain of supermarkets once prevalent in north-eastern Pennsylvania, New York, Vermont and Ohio. With the 1997 demise of its owner, Burt Prentice Flickinger Jr., who had been instrumental in the success and growth of "S.M. Flickinger Co.", the company started a slow demise, and the last store disappeared in March 2010. Flickinger's son Burt III works as a consultant in the grocery industry.

References

https://buffalonews.com/1997/04/21/burt-flickinger-jr-dies-businessman-and-philanthropist/
https://web.archive.org/web/20100411213646/http://www.dispatch.com/live/content/local_news/stories/2010/03/13/customers-workers-pained-by-supermarkets-closing.html

External links 
 

Defunct supermarkets of the United States